Arthur West may refer to:

 Arthur Graeme West (1891–1917), British writer and war poet
 Arthur Joseph West (1863–1937), British railway engineer